Nedzad Catic (born 2 August 1978) is an Australian former professional rugby league footballer who played in the 1990s and 2000s. He played at club level for the Penrith Panthers (Heritage No. 385), the Sydney Roosters (Heritage No. 1025), the Wakefield Trinity Wildcats (Heritage No. 1233), the Castleford Tigers (Heritage No.) and the Barrow Raiders.

Background
Catic was born in Sydney, New South Wales, Australia, and he is of Bosnian descent.

He played his junior rugby league for the St Clair Comets, before being signed by the Penrith Panthers.

Playing career
Catic played  for the Sydney Roosters in the 2003 NRL grand final which was lost to the Penrith Panthers. Having won the 2002 NRL Premiership, the Roosters traveled to England to play the 2003 World Club Challenge against Super League champions, St Helens R.F.C. in which Catic played at from the interchange bench in Sydney's victory.

Catic played for the Roosters from the interchange bench in their 2004 NRL grand final loss to cross-Sydney rivals, the Canterbury-Bankstown Bulldogs.

Honours
Sydney Roosters
2003 World Club Challenge
2003 Grand Final Runner-Up
2004 Grand Final Runner-Up

References

External links
Barrow Raiders profile
Ned Catic Wakefield Profile
Wildcats snap up Roosters forward
Suspensions add to Wildcats' woes
Statistics at thecastlefordtigers.co.uk

1978 births
Living people
Australian rugby league players
Australian expatriate sportspeople in England
Australian people of Bosnia and Herzegovina descent
Penrith Panthers players
Sydney Roosters players
Wakefield Trinity players
Castleford Tigers players
Barrow Raiders players
Rugby league centres
Rugby league props
Rugby league second-rows
Rugby league players from Sydney